Berlin Township is one of the twenty-two townships of Knox County, Ohio, United States.  The 2010 census found 1,738 people in the township.

Geography
Located in the northern part of the county, it borders the following townships:
Jefferson Township, Richland County - north
Worthington Township, Richland County - northeast corner
Pike Township - east
Morris Township - south
Wayne Township - southwest corner
Middlebury Township - west

No municipalities are located in Berlin Township.

Name and history
Berlin Township was established in 1822. It was named after Berlin, Connecticut, the hometown of many of its early settlers.

Statewide, other Berlin Townships are located in Delaware, Erie, Holmes, and Mahoning counties.

Government
The township is governed by a three-member board of trustees, who are elected in November of odd-numbered years to a four-year term beginning on the following January 1. Two are elected in the year after the presidential election and one is elected in the year before it. There is also an elected township fiscal officer, who serves a four-year term beginning on April 1 of the year after the election, which is held in November of the year before the presidential election. Vacancies in the fiscal officership or on the board of trustees are filled by the remaining trustees.

References

External links
County website

Townships in Knox County, Ohio
Townships in Ohio